Galaxia may refer to:
The superior form of Gaia (Foundation universe), a planet in Isaac Asimov's Foundation Series
Galaxia (plant), a genus in the iris family
"Galaxia", a 1996 trance song by Ferry Corsten
Sailor Galaxia, an antagonist from the original Sailor Moon anime series
Galaxia, the sword Meta Knight wields in the Kirby video game series
Galaxia, Hong Kong, a private housing estate in Diamond Hill, Hong Kong
Operation Galaxia, the codename for 1978 attempted coup d'état in Spain

See also
Galaxias, a genus of small freshwater fish in the family Galaxiidae
Galaxy (disambiguation)
Galaxie (disambiguation)
Galaxian (disambiguation)